The men's decathlon at the 1974 European Athletics Championships was held in Rome, Italy, at Stadio Olimpico on 6 and 7 September 1974.

Medalists

Results

Final
6/7 September

Participation
According to an unofficial count, 24 athletes from 14 countries participated in the event.

 (1)
 (2)
 (1)
 (1)
 (2)
 (1)
 (1)
 (3)
 (1)
 (3)
 (1)
 (3)
 (2)
 (2)

References

Decathlon
Combined events at the European Athletics Championships